Kirigalpotta is the 2nd tallest mountain in Sri Lanka at  above mean sea level, and is also the highest mountain in the country whose summit is accessible to the general public (the highest point, Pidurutalagala, is occupied by a military base and off-limits to the public). The peak is situated near the city of Nuwara Eliya, within the Nuwara Eliya District. Only one  hiking trail provides access to the mountain's summit via the Horton Plains National Park, although the trail is not very popular.

See also 
 Geography of Sri Lanka
 List of mountains in Sri Lanka

References 

Mountains of Sri Lanka
Populated places in Nuwara Eliya District
Landforms of Nuwara Eliya District